"Gotta Catch 'Em All" is a 2001 song by 50.Grind. While it only made #57 on the UK Singles Chart, the song was the only Nintendo-sanctioned single release and the band was interviewed in by the Daily Express newspaper in December 2001. Afterwards, the band performed the song on Nickelodeon UK. The song also made #115 on the Top 2000 on NPO Radio 2 in the Netherlands.

Tracklisting
Gotta Catch 'em All (Radio Edit) - 3:07
Gotta Catch 'em All (Extended Version) - 3:39
Gotta Catch 'em All (Club Mix) - 6:32
Gotta Catch 'em All (Karaokemon) - 3:07
Gotta Catch 'em All (Video) - 3:10

References

Songs about fictional characters
2001 singles
2001 songs
Songs from Pokémon
Songs written by Johannes Jørgensen
Songs written by Lars Halvor Jensen
Songs written by Martin M. Larsson